The Bofinger Chair, also named BA 1171, was designed by architect and designer Helmut Bätzner in 1964. In close co-operation with Bofinger company, situated in Ilsfeld in Baden-Württemberg/Germany, under owner and managing director Rudolf Baresel-Bofinger, the Bofinger stacking chair was developed into the first one-piece plastic chair worldwide in fibreglass- reinforced polyester to be mass-produced in one single pressing process over a steel mould.  The material was dyed all way through before being processed and available in a range of colours including white, yellow, black, red, blue, green, brown and orange. In a long trial series the characteristic shape of the chair was found in regard to seating shape, maximum stability by smallest quantity of material used, required elasticity, stacking capability, and industrial mass-production. The pressing process in the heated steel mould with a weight of approximately 11 tons lasted under five minutes and required as finishing treatment only simple scraping round the edges to remove excess polyester. 

In 1966 the Bofinger Chair made its debut at the furniture fair in Cologne. The same year it received the ‘Rosenthal-Studio’ Award in the presence of Chancellor Ludwig Erhard, Philipp Rosenthal und Walter Gropius. The Bofinger Chair became a design icon of its time. In 1971 on the occasion of an art happening in Berlin twelve well-known artists - among those Joseph Beuys, Sigmar Polke, Günther Uecker, Wolf Vostell, and Stefan Wewerka – transformed the Bofinger stacking chair into an art object. Museums, such as the Victoria & Albert Museum in London, the Centre Pompidou in Paris and the Vitra Design Museum in Weil am Rhein, included the Bofinger Chair in their collection. The Bofinger Chair is considered one of the most important classics of modern furniture design history.

References

External links 

 http://designwissen.net/seiten/vitra-klassiker
 https://collections.vam.ac.uk/item/O372072/stacking-chair
 http://www.materialatlas.com/topic9813.html
 http://www.bofingerproduction.com

Chairs
Individual models of furniture
Stacking chairs